Hemmatabad-e Agah (also Romanized as Hemmatābād-e Āgāh; also known as Hemmatābād) is a village in Eslamiyeh Rural District, in the Central District of Rafsanjan County, Kerman Province, Iran. At the 2006 census, its population was 2,046, in 497 families.

References 

Populated places in Rafsanjan County